The Arrows was a Canadian new wave band active during the 1980s (and not to be confused with the British band 'Arrows').

Biography
The Arrows were formed in 1981 by vocalist Dean McTaggart, the group's only consistent member. They recorded a single ("Treat Her Right" b/w "Come On Up") in 1981.  The following year, the group issued a 4 song mini-album called Misunderstood which was recorded at Grant Avenue Studios and produced by Daniel Lanois.

In 1984, the band landed a deal with A&M Records.  With the help of producer David Tyson, who also became McTaggart's frequent writing partner, the Arrows' 1984 debut album Stand Back was a national success in Canada, providing a top 40 hit with "Meet Me in the Middle".  The album sold well, and the band found themselves as the opening act on the UK leg of Chris de Burgh's 1984 tour.

Upon returning home, they went back to the studio for work on their second album The Lines Are Open, which saw its release in October 1985. The singles "Heart of the City", "Talk Talk" and "Chains" all saw success in Canada, but pressures from management for a breakout hit were causing problems within the band, and following a cross-Canada tour, the group called it quits at the end of 1986.

In 1995, a CD compilation Talk Talk: The Best of The Arrows surfaced on a German import label that contained the majority of the tracks from their first two albums. Stand Back were re-issued on CD in 2011, and The Lines Are Open was re-issued in 2013.

McTaggart continued with his songwriting career, writing hit songs for artists such as "Heaven Help My Heart" by Wynonna, and, as co-writer, "Unsung Hero" by Terri Clark and several hits by Amanda Marshall, notably "Birmingham" and her Canadian AC No. 1 hit "Dark Horse", which also became a hit for Mila Mason.

1981 line-up
This line-up recorded the 1981 debut single "Treat Her Right" b/w "Come On Up"
 Vocals - Dean McTaggart
 Drums and Percussion - Michael Sloski
 Keyboards - Gabor Szepesi
 Bass - Hendrik Rilk
 Guitars - Rusty McCarthy

1982 line-up
This line-up recorded the 1982 4-song mini-album Misunderstood.
 Vocals - Dean McTaggart
 Drums and Percussion - Michael Sloski
 Keyboards - Rob Gusevs
 Bass - Hendrik Rilk
 Guitars - Rusty McCarthy
 Saxophone - Earl Seymour

1984 line-up
This line recorded the 1984 album Stand Back.
 Vocals - Dean McTaggart
 Guitars - Doug Macaskill
 Keyboards - Rob Gusevs
 Saxophone - Earl Seymour

With session musicians: 
 Bass - Peter Bleakney, Howard Ayee
 Drums - Michael Sloski, Gary Craig
 Percussion - Matt Zimbel
 Keyboards, Vocals – David Tyson
 Backing Vocals – Al Van Wart, Eddie Schwartz

1985 line-up
This line recorded the 1985 album The Lines Are Open.
 Vocals - Dean McTaggart
 Keyboards - Rob Gusevs
 Saxophone - Earl Seymour
 Guitars - Doug Macaskill
 Bass - Glenn Olive
 Drums - Bobby Economou

With session musicians: 
 Alto Saxophone - Vernon Dorge
 Backing Vocals - Charity Brown, David Blamires, John Rutledge, Sharon Lee Williams, David Tyson
 Percussion - Memo Acevedo
 Trumpet - Rick Waychesko, Steve McDade

Discography

Studio albums
 Stand Back (1984), A&M Records
 The Lines Are Open (1985), Avion Records

Compilation albums
 Talk Talk: The Best of The Arrows (1995), Long Island Records

EPs
 Misunderstood (1982), Spontaneous Records

Singles
 "Treat Her Right" (1981), El Mocambo Records
 "Come On Up" (1981), El Mocambo Records
 "Lovelight" (1982), Spontaneous Records
 "If It's Love" (1982), Spontaneous Records
 "Meet Me in the Middle" (1984), A&M Records  - Canada #30
 "Say It Isn't True" (1984), A&M Records
 "Never Be Another One" (1984), A&M Records
 "Girl in 313" (1984), A&M Records
 "Talk Talk" (1985), A&M Records - Canada #47
 "Easy Street" (1985), A&M Records
 "I Owe You" (1985), A&M Records
 "Heart of the City" (1986), A&M Records - Canada #57
 "Tell It To My Heart" (1986), A&M Records
 "Chains" (1986), A&M Records - Canada #93
 "Wild One" (1986), A&M Records

References

External links
Jam! Canadian Pop Encyclopedia - The Arrows entry
CanConRox entry
Dean McTaggart - singer, songwriter, record producer, musician - The Arrows

Canadian new wave musical groups
Musical groups established in 1981
Musical groups disestablished in 1986
Musical groups from Toronto
1981 establishments in Ontario
1986 disestablishments in Ontario
Canadian pop rock music groups